Andy Kellegher is an Irish actor.

Career
He is best known for his role as Polliver in HBO's Game of Thrones and for his portrayal of Brendan "Beady" Burke in the Irish TV series Red Rock as a main cast member.

He has appeared in numerous Irish television and film projects, including Parked (2010), A Nightingale Falling (2014) and The Hit Producer (2014).

Filmography

Film

Television

Theatre 
 The Well of the Saints, directed by Garry Hynes
 The Playboy of the Western World, directed by Garry Hynes
 The Lieutenant of Inishmore, directed by Andrew Flynn
 Country Music, directed by Andrew Flynn
 The Good Thief, directed by Andrew Flynn
 Translations, directed by Andrew Flynn (Town Hall Theatre)
 Juno and the Paycock, directed by Andrew Flynn (Cork Opera House)
 Here We Are Again Still, directed by Andrew Flynn
 Green Street, directed by Paul Meade (2012)
 The Circus of Perseverance, directed by Philip Doherty (2013)
 Retreat, directed by Bairbre Ni Chaoimh (The New Theatre, Dublin, 2014)
 Shibboleth, directed by Stacey Gregg (Peacock Theatre, 2015)
 Observe the Sons of Ulster Marching Towards the Somme, directed by Jeremy Herrin (2016)

References

External links 
 

21st-century Irish male actors
Living people
Irish male television actors
Irish male film actors
Year of birth missing (living people)
Place of birth missing (living people)